= List of international premieral trips made by Zhu Rongji =

This is a list of international trips made by Zhu Rongji, the premier of China from March 1998 to March 2003.

== Summary ==
The number of visits per country where he has travelled are:

- One visit to: Algeria, Austria, Bangladesh, Brunei, Bulgaria, Cambodia, Cameroon, Canada, Denmark, Egypt, Germany, India, Indonesia, Ireland, Italy, Japan, Kazakhstan, Kenya, Luxembourg, Malaysia, Maldives, Morocco, Nepal, Pakistan, Philippines, Singapore, South Africa, South Korea, Sri Lanka, Thailand, the Netherlands, Turkey, the United Kingdom, the United States, Vietnam
- Two visits to: Belgium, France, Russia

World map highlighting countries visited by Zhu Rongji during his premiership. One visit Two visits China

== 1998 ==
Dates	Country	Location	Details
31 March–5 April	United Kingdom	London	Official visit.
5–7 April	France	Paris	Official visit.

== 1999 ==
Dates	Country	Location	Details
24–27 February	Russia	Moscow Saint Petersburg	Official visit.
6–14 April	United States	Los Angeles Washington, D.C. Denver Chicago New York City Boston	Official visit.
14–20 April	Canada	St. John's Toronto Ottawa Calgary Victoria Vancouver	Official visit.
22–26 November	Malaysia	Kuala Lumpur	Official visit.
26–29 November	Philippines	Manila	Official visit.
29 November–1 December	Singapore		Official visit.
1–4 December	Vietnam	Ho Chi Minh City Hanoi	Official visit.

== 2000 ==
Dates	Country	Location	Details
27–29 June	Bulgaria	Sofia	Official visit.
29 June–3 July	Germany	Berlin	Official visit.
3–4 July	Luxembourg	Luxembourg City	Official visit.
4–5 July	Netherlands	Amsterdam The Hague	Official visit.
5–9 July	Italy	Rome	Official visit.
9–13 July	Belgium	Brussels	Official visit.
12–17 October	Japan	Tokyo Kobe Osaka	Official visit.
17–22 October	South Korea	Seoul	Official visit.
23–26 November	Singapore		

== 2001 ==
Dates	Country	Location	Details
11–14 May	Pakistan	Islamabad Lahore	Official visit.
14–16 May	Nepal	Kathmandu	Official visit.
16–17 May	Maldives	Malé	Official visit.
17–19 May	Sri Lanka	Colombo	Official visit.
19–22 May	Thailand	Bangkok	Official visit.
2–5 September	Ireland	Dublin	Official visit.
5–7 September	Belgium	Brussels	Official visit.
7–12 September	Russia	Saint Petersburg Moscow	Official visit.
12–15 September	Kazakhstan	Astana Almaty	Official visit.
4–7 November	Brunei	Bandar Seri Begawan	
7–11 November	Indonesia	Jakarta Bali	Official visit.

== 2002 ==
Dates	Country	Location	Details
11–13 January	Bangladesh	Dhaka	Official visit.
13–18 January	India	Agra New Delhi Mumbai Bangalore	Official visit.
15–19 April	Turkey	Ankara Istanbul	Official visit.
19–23 April	Egypt	Cairo Sharm El Sheikh	Official visit.
23–26 April	Kenya	Nairobi	Official visit.
25–27 August	Algeria	Algiers	Official visit.
27–29 August	Morocco	Rabat Casablanca	Official visit.
29–31 August	Cameroon	Yaounde	Official visit.
31 August–6 September	South Africa	Cape Town Johannesburg	Official visit.
19 –22 September	Austria	Vienna	Official visit.
22–26 September	Denmark	Copenhagen	Official visit.
26–28 September	France	Paris Toulouse	Official visit.
1–5 November	Cambodia	Phnom Penh	Official visit.
